This list contains the names of notable civil rights activists who were active during the 19th century.  Although not often highlighted in American history, before Rosa Parks changed America when she was arrested for refusing to give up her seat to a white passenger on a Montgomery, Alabama city bus in December 1955, 19th-century African-American civil rights activists worked strenuously from the 1850s until the 1880s for the cause of equal treatment in public transportation.

Activists 

Harriet Tubman
Philip Alexander Bell
Katherine "Kate" Brown
Charlotte L. Brown
Norris Wright Cuney
Robert Fox
Nellie Griswold Francis
Elizabeth "Lizzie" Jennings
Sallie Robinson
Frederick Douglass
Sojourner Truth
Booker T. Washington
Ida B. Wells
Florence Kelley
W. E. B. Du Bois

African-American civil rights activists
Lists of activists